Christopher Núñez (born April 11, 1973) is an American tattoo artist, television personality, and entrepreneur. He is the owner of Handcrafted Tattoo and Art Gallery, a tattoo shop located in Fort Lauderdale, Florida, and was a judge on the reality television show Ink Master.

Early life
Of Cuban descent, he grew up in Miami, Florida. Núñez had always been drawn to art, and began painting graffiti as a teenager, which he claims his father supported as long as it was an image and not just Núñez's name. Soon, he discovered tattooing, immediately falling in love with it and obtaining an apprenticeship at a local tattoo shop. Núñez claims that he is very grateful for the experience of an apprenticeship when he was younger, as he worked his way up from background work – cleaning, running errands, fixing machines – to learning how to tattoo and tattooing fundamentals. His father died when Núñez was 18 years old, leading to him rebelling during his late teens and early twenties. Núñez's first tattoos, which he got at age 16, were of his parents' names.

Career
After being a graffiti artist, Núñez switched to tattooing, though even after opening a tattoo shop with friends, he continued to do part-time construction work. He was the owner of Handcrafted Tattoo and Art Gallery in Fort Lauderdale, Florida. He and Ami James later opened Love Hate Tattoos on Miami Beach. He now owns Liberty City Tattoo in Wynwood-Miami, Florida, USA.

He was a cast member of the TLC network's reality show Miami Ink, and later became a judge on the Spike network's reality competition, Ink Master, in which tattoo artists compete in challenges assessing their tattoo and related artistic skills.

He is a partner in the media corporation Ridgeline Empire, which operates the subsidiaries Ink Skins and Upset Gentlemen  and an animation studio with two animated series in development as of 2014: Hoodbrats and Toothians.

References

External links

Living people
Nunez, Chris
American tattoo artists
American television personalities
Hispanic and Latino American artists
American people of Cuban descent
1973 births